A leadership election was held by the United States House of Representatives Democratic Caucus before the beginning of the 116th United States Congress on January 3, 2019. The election determined who will be nominated by the caucus for the speakership election as well as who would occupy other leadership positions within the House Democratic Caucus. The following positions were nominated or elected on November 29: Speaker of the U.S. House of Representatives, House Majority Leader, House Majority Whip, House Assistant Majority Leader, Democratic Caucus Chair, and Democratic Caucus Vice Chair. The Democratic Congressional Campaign Committee Chair, the Policy and Communications Committee's Chair and its three Co-Chairs, Junior Caucus Representative and Freshman Class Representative were elected the next day, and a third co-chair was added to the Steering and Policy Committee by the Leader.

Nominee for Speaker

Candidates
 Rep. Nancy Pelosi (D-CA), House Minority Leader and former and current Speaker

Potential candidates
 Rep. Jim Himes (D-CT), Chair of the New Democrat Coalition (supported Pelosi)
 Rep. Seth Moulton (D-MA) (opposed Pelosi)
 Rep. Adam Schiff (D-CA), Ranking Member of the House Intelligence Committee (supported Pelosi)
 Rep. Frank Pallone (D-NJ), Ranking Member of the House Energy and Commerce Committee

Declined
 Rep. Barbara Lee (D-CA), former Co-Chair of the Congressional Progressive Caucus and Chair of the Congressional Black Caucus (ran for Democratic Caucus Chair)
 Rep. Tim Ryan (D-OH) (running for President of the United States in 2020)
 Rep. Linda Sanchez (D-CA), Vice Chair of the House Democratic Caucus (withdrew from race for DCC)
 Rep. Cheri Bustos (D-IL), Co-Chair of the Democratic Policy and Communications Committee (ran for DCC)
 Rep. Marcia Fudge (D-OH), former Chair of the Congressional Black Caucus and replacement Permanent Chair of the 2016 Democratic National Convention (supported Pelosi)
 Rep. Steny Hoyer (D-MD), House Minority Whip and former House Majority Leader (ran for and won House Majority Leader)
 Rep. Hakeem Jeffries (D-NY), Co-Chair of the Democratic Policy and Communications Committee (ran for and won Democratic Caucus Chair)

Results

Majority Leader

Candidates
 Rep. Steny Hoyer (D-MD), House Minority Whip and former House Majority Leader

Results

Majority Whip

Candidates
 Rep. Jim Clyburn (D-SC), House Assistant Minority Leader and former House Majority Whip

Withdrew
 Rep. Diana DeGette (D-CO), member of the House Minority chief deputy whip team

Results

Democratic Assistant Leader

Candidates
 Rep. Ben Ray Luján (D-NM), Chair of the DCCC

Withdrawn
 Rep. Cheri Bustos (D-IL) (running for Chair of the DCCC)
 Rep. David Cicilline (D-RI), Co-Chair of the Democratic Policy and Communications Committee (running for Chair of the DPCC)

Results

Democratic Caucus Chair

Candidates
 Rep. Barbara Lee (D-CA), former Co-Chair of the Congressional Progressive Caucus and Chair of the Congressional Black Caucus
 Rep. Hakeem Jeffries (D-NY), Co-Chair of the Democratic Policy and Communications Committee and member of the Congressional Progressive Caucus

Withdrawn
 Rep. Linda Sanchez (D-CA), Vice Chair of the House Democratic Caucus (withdrew after husband's federal indictment)

Endorsements

Results

Democratic Caucus Vice Chair

Candidates
 Rep. Katherine Clark (D-MA), DCCC Recruitment Vice Chair and member of the Congressional Progressive Caucus
 Rep. Pete Aguilar (D-CA), Congressional Hispanic Caucus Whip and member of the New Democrat Coalition

Results

DCCC Chair

Candidates
 Rep. Cheri Bustos (D-IL), Co-Chair of the Democratic Policy and Communications Committee and DCCC "Heartland Engagement" Chair
 Rep. Denny Heck (D-WA), DCCC Recruitment Chair
 Rep. Suzan DelBene (D-WA), DCCC Finance Co-Chair

Withdrawn
 Rep. Sean Patrick Maloney (D-NY) (withdrew due to hospitalization)

Results

DPCC Chair
This is a newly created position of the United States House Democratic Policy and Communications Committee which will rank above the three current co-chairs.

Candidates
 Rep. David Cicilline (D-RI), Co-Chair of the Democratic Policy and Communications Committee

Results

DPCC Co-Chairs

Candidates
 Rep. Matt Cartwright (D-PA)
 Rep. Debbie Dingell (D-MI) 
 Rep. Adriano Espaillat (D-NY)
 Rep. John Garamendi (D-CA)
 Rep.-elect Chrissy Houlahan (D-PA)
 Rep. Ted Lieu (D-CA)

Results

Junior Caucus Representative

Candidates
 Rep. Jamie Raskin (D-MD)
 Rep. Terri Sewell (D-AL)

Results

Freshman Class Representatives

Candidates
 Rep. Joe Neguse (D-CO)

Results

References

Democratic Party (United States) leadership elections
United States House of Representatives
United States House of Representatives Democratic Caucus leadership election